Keats were a short-lived British rock band, which produced one eponymous album in 1984. It was an Alan Parsons Project offshoot. Its members were Colin Blunstone (vocals), Ian Bairnson (guitars), Pete Bardens (keyboards), David Paton (bass and backing vocals) and Stuart Elliott (drums and percussion). Richard Cottle also provided additional keyboard parts, as well as saxophone and synthesizers.

Discography

Keats (1984)
1996 US CD Track listing

References

Notes

External links
https://www.discogs.com/Keats-Keats/master/108481

English progressive rock groups
Musical groups established in 1984
British soft rock music groups